Lithophane signosa, the signate pinion or sycamore pinion moth, is a species of moth in the family Noctuidae (owlet moths). The species was described by Francis Walker in 1857. It is found in North America.

The MONA or Hodges number for Lithophane signosa is 9895.

References

Further reading
 Lafontaine, J. Donald & Schmidt, B. Christian (2010). "Annotated check list of the Noctuoidea (Insecta, Lepidoptera) of North America north of Mexico". ZooKeys, vol. 40, 1-239.
 Arnett, Ross H. (2000). American Insects: A Handbook of the Insects of America North of Mexico. CRC Press.

External links
Butterflies and Moths of North America
NCBI Taxonomy Browser, Lithophane signosa

signosa
Moths described in 1857